Raul Castillo  is an American mixed martial artist from Half Moon Bay, California. He last competed in 2015, and made appearances for the Strikeforce promotion.

Mixed martial arts record

|-
| Win
| align=center| 7–1
| Mauricio Alonso
| Decision
| Dragon House 19
| 
| align=center| 3
| align=center| 5:00
| San Francisco, California, United States
| 
|-|-
| Loss
| align=center| 6–1
| Yancy Medeiros
| Decision (unanimous)
| Strikeforce Challengers: Kaufman vs. Hashi
| 
| align=center| 3
| align=center| 5:00
| San Jose, California, United States
| 
|-
| Win
| align=center| 6–0
| Brandon Michaels
| Submission (rear-naked choke)
| Strikeforce: Shamrock vs. Diaz
| 
| align=center| 1
| align=center| 1:45
| San Jose, California, United States
|Catchweight (188 lb) bout.
|-
| Win
| align=center| 5–0
| Josh Neal
| TKO (punches)
| GC 80: Summer Showdown
| 
| align=center| 1
| align=center| 2:12
| San Francisco, California, United States
| 
|-
| Win
| align=center| 4–0
| Eric Lawson
| TKO
| GC 72: Seasons Beatings
| 
| align=center| 2
| align=center| 2:23
| San Francisco, California, United States
| 
|-
| Win
| align=center| 3–0
| Nik Theotikos
| Submission (choke)
| GC 66: Battle Ground
| 
| align=center| 1
| align=center| N/A
| San Francisco, California, United States
| 
|-
| Win
| align=center| 2–0
| Andrew Montanez
| TKO (punches)
| Strikeforce: Triple Threat
| 
| align=center| 1
| align=center| 2:10
| San Jose, California, United States
| 
|-
| Win
| align=center| 1–0
| Victor Cabian
| TKO
| West Coast Fighters
| 
| align=center| 1
| align=center| 1:30
| Portland, Oregon, United States
|

References

External links
 Raul Castillo mixed martial arts official site

American male mixed martial artists
Living people
Middleweight mixed martial artists
Year of birth missing (living people)
Place of birth missing (living people)
Sportspeople from California
People from Half Moon Bay, California